Axinelline A is a COX-2 inhibitor with the molecular formula C12H15NO6 which is produced by the bacterium Streptomyces axinellae.

References 

COX-2 inhibitors
Ethyl esters
Catechols
Benzamides